Arthur Henry Beavis (March 1905 – 13 March 1978) was a British boxer. He competed in the men's featherweight event at the 1924 Summer Olympics. At the 1924 Summer Olympics, he defeated Jean Flammang of Luxembourg, before losing to Pedro Quartucci of Argentina.

Beavis won the 1924 and 1925 Amateur Boxing Association British featherweight title, when boxing out of the Polytechnic Boxing Club.

References

External links
 

1905 births
1978 deaths
British male boxers
Olympic boxers of Great Britain
Boxers at the 1924 Summer Olympics
Sportspeople from Reading, Berkshire
Featherweight boxers